The Cadillac Debutante was exhibited at the Chicago Auto Show as a concept car in 1950. The interior is upholstered in leopard skin, has 24-karat gold instrument panels, and 24-karat gold fittings. At $35,000, it was claimed to be Cadillac's most luxurious car ever at the time. However, it never reached the production line, making it a one-off.

External links
Chicago Auto Show

Debutante